List of notable events in music that took place in the year 1969.


Specific locations
1969 in British music
1969 in Norwegian music

Specific genres
1969 in country music
1969 in jazz

Events

Summary
Perhaps the two most famous musical events of 1969 were concerts. At a Rolling Stones concert in Altamont, California, a fan was stabbed to death by Hells Angels, a biker gang that had been hired to provide security for the event. In retrospect, some commentators have concluded that the violence signaled the end of the "hippie" movement, which espoused an ethos of free love and peace. Even more famous than the Altamont concert was the Woodstock festival, which consisted of dozens of the most famous performers in the world at the time, playing together in an atmosphere of peace with nature and love, with many thousands of concert goers; it is still one of the largest concerts in the history of the world.  One of those who performed was Ravi Shankar, his presence reflecting a growing interest in Indian and other Eastern music; Shankar later said that the 1960s "got India wrong". "Black Woodstock", the Harlem Cultural Festival, took place in New York City. The Beatles' rooftop concert was the last time the band played together in public.

The 1967 musical Hair generated the same-named 1968 album, whose cuts include "Aquarius" and "Let The Sunshine In", "Hair", "Good Morning Starshine", "Easy to Be Hard" (covered, chronologically and respectively, by The 5th Dimension at number 1, The Cowsills at number 2, Oliver at number 3, Three Dog Night at number 4, on the Billboard Hot 100 in 1969), and others, and a London Cast album released in April 1969.

The Isle of Wight Festival saw the return of Bob Dylan to live music after his motorbike accident in 1966.

US and UK pop music remained popular worldwide, with few European acts making the charts outside their home countries; exceptions included Jane Birkin & Serge Gainsbourg, Shocking Blue, Georges Moustaki and Christian Anders.

David Bowie's "Space Oddity" became a huge hit in this year, being released at the time that American astronauts first landed on the moon. The song, the story of an astronaut named Major Tom who goes into space and is entranced by the beauty of seeing Earth from such a great distance and consequently lets himself float off into space, never again to return, was chosen by the BBC as the theme song for the television coverage of the moon landing. The remainder of the album, Man of Words/Man of Music, was too eccentric for mainstream acceptance, though it established a devoted fanbase for Bowie, who would go on to become one of the most popular musicians in the world.

King Crimson's In the Court of the Crimson King is a pioneering album in the development of progressive rock. The album drew upon influences like Procol Harum, The Moody Blues and The Nice to form a sound melding rock and roll with classical influences in long pieces of music.  Similar albums by The Moody Blues, Procol Harum and The Nice, as well as Genesis, Yes and Pink Floyd were also released this year, expanding the range of prog rock and developing it into a full-fledged genre.

The Stooges' eponymous debut, The Stooges, was also released this year to little critical or popular acceptance. The album, however, went on to become one of the most important recordings in the early development of punk rock, as did Kick Out The Jams by Detroit protopunkers MC5.

Johnny Cash's At San Quentin included his only Top Ten pop hit, "A Boy Named Sue".  The album was a sequel to last year's At Folsom Prison. Also in country music, Merle Haggard's Same Train, Different Time, a tribute to Jimmie Rodgers, was enormously popular and influenced the development of the Bakersfield sound into outlaw country within a few years.

Creedence Clearwater Revival cement their success from the previous year. Having had a single US number 11 hit in 1968 with "Suzie Q", they release not only their second, but also their third and fourth proper studio album in 1969, as well as drawing a total of four top 3 hits from these three albums. Starting with Bayou Country, including the US number 2 hit "Proud Mary", and continuing with Green River and finally Willy and the Poor Boys, which, during the year, transformed them from an up-and-coming underground act to bona fide rock stars. During 1969, Creedence Clearwater Revival had number 2 hits in the US with "Proud Mary", "Green River" and "Bad Moon Rising", and also have a number 3 hit with "Down on the Corner"/"Fortunate Son".

Gilberto Gil and Caetano Veloso released enormously popular albums in Brazil, Gilberto Gil and Caetano Veloso, respectively.  The pair's fusion of bossa nova, samba and other native Brazilian folk influences, melded with politically and socially aware lyrics, kickstarted what came to be known as Tropicalia.  Both musicians moved to London after a period of imprisonment for anti-government activities in Brazil.

Family released their second album, Family Entertainment, in their native Britain. It is their first top 10 album in the United Kingdom, hitting number six. "The Weaver's Answer", which opens the record, becomes their most popular song in their concert performances. By the end of the year, however, they lose and replace two members, and their first attempt to break through commercially in the United States backfires miserably.

Elvis Presley returned to live performances at the International Hotel in Las Vegas; breaking all attendance records in his 57-concert run. He also enjoyed great success with his songs "In the Ghetto" and "Suspicious Minds".

The Wendy Carlos album Switched-On Bach was one of the first classical albums to sell 500,000 copies, and helped bring classical music into the popular sphere, as did Mason Williams' "Classical Gas", played on classical guitar, in addition to being accompanied by one of the first successful music videos. The composition won three Grammy Awards: Best Instrumental Composition, Best Contemporary-Pop Performance, Instrumental, and Best Instrumental Arrangement.  In the meantime, German trumpeter Manfred Schoof's free jazz album, European Echoes, a recording of his half-hour free improvisation broadcast on German radio in June 1969, featured international musicians and is regarded as a seminal album in the genre.  Alexander von Schlippenbach's The Living Music, recorded a couple of months earlier, is also now regarded as a pioneering work.

Chutney music was also first recorded in 1969, in Trinidad and Tobago by Sundar Popo.

1969 was the last year in which the United States government gave greater financial support, through the National Endowment for the Arts (NEA) "Music Program" to opera than it did to other classical music, and the first year in which it gave any support at all to jazz and folk music.

New York City Ballet celebrates their 25th anniversary with performances at the David H. Koch Theater Lincoln Center.

Major events
January 4 – Guitarist Jimi Hendrix is accused of arrogance by British television producers after playing an impromptu version of "Sunshine of Your Love" past his allotted timeslot on the BBC1 show Happening for Lulu.
January 12 – Led Zeppelin's eponymous debut album released.
January 18 – Pete Best wins his defamation lawsuit against The Beatles. Best had originally sought $8 million, but ends up being awarded much less.
January 30 – The Beatles' rooftop concert: The Beatles perform for the last time in public, on the roof of the Apple building at 3 Savile Row, London. The performance, which is filmed for the Let It Be movie, is stopped early by police after neighbors complain about the noise.
February 3 
Eric Burdon & The Animals disband.
John Lennon, George Harrison and Ringo Starr hire Allen Klein as The Beatles' new business manager, against the wishes of Paul McCartney.
February 4 – Paul McCartney hires the law firm of Eastman & Eastman, Linda Eastman's father's law firm, as general legal counsel for Apple Records.
February 15 – Vickie Jones is arrested for impersonating Aretha Franklin in a concert performance. Jones' impersonation is so convincing that nobody in the audience asked for a refund.
February 17 – Johnny Cash and Bob Dylan record together in Nashville, Tennessee. Only one song, "Girl from the North Country", would be released from these sessions.
February 18 – Lulu and Maurice Gibb are married in the UK. Maurice's twin brother Robin Gibb is best man. Three thousand guests, most of them uninvited, turn out for the affair.
February 24 – Johnny Cash performs "A Boy Named Sue" at California's San Quentin State Prison
March 1 – During a performance at Miami's Dinner Key Auditorium, Jim Morrison of the Doors is arrested for allegedly exposing himself during the show. Morrison is officially charged with lewd and lascivious behavior, indecent behavior, open profanity and public drunkenness.
March 2 – John Lennon performs publicly outside The Beatles for the first time, with Yoko Ono at an improvised concert in Cambridge, England.
March 7 – The Who release "Pinball Wizard" as a single with a B-Side of "Dogs (Part Two)."
March 12
The 11th Grammy Awards are presented in Chicago, Los Angeles, Nashville and New York. Glen Campbell's By the Time I Get to Phoenix wins Album of the Year, Simon & Garfunkel's "Mrs. Robinson" wins Record of the Year and Roger Miller's "Little Green Apples", performed by Miller and O. C. Smith, wins Song of the Year. José Feliciano wins Best New Artist.
Paul McCartney marries Linda Eastman in London.
George Harrison and his wife Pattie are arrested in the UK on charges of hashish possession.
March 15 – Judy Garland marries Mickey Deans in London.
March 20 – John Lennon marries Yoko Ono in Gibraltar.
March 25-31 – John Lennon and Yoko Ono host a "Bed-In" for peace in their room at the Amsterdam Hilton, turning their honeymoon into an antiwar event. Lennon also learns from a morning newspaper that publisher Dick James has sold his shares of Northern Songs to Lew Grade's Associated Television (ATV).
March 26 – Lotti Golden records her debut LP Motor-Cycle (Atlantic SD 8223) at Atlantic Studios in New York City, featured in Newsweek (July 1969).
March 29 – At the 14th annual Eurovision Song Contest held at the Teatro Real, Madrid, Spain, the final result is a four-way tie for first place between Spain ("Vivo cantando" – Salomé); United Kingdom ("Boom Bang-a-Bang" – Lulu); Netherlands ("De Troubadour" – Lenny Kuhr) and France ("Un jour, un enfant" – Frida Boccara). As there is no tie-break rule in force at this time, the four entries involved, who each scored 18 points, are declared ex-aequo winners.
April 1 – The Beach Boys file a lawsuit against their record label, Capitol Records, for $2,041,446.64 in unpaid royalties and producer's fees for Brian Wilson. Capitol retaliates by deleting most of its Beach Boys catalog, severely limiting the band's income.
April 8 – Opening for Ten Years After at the Fillmore East in New York City, Family perform their first U.S. concert, and the show is an unmitigated disaster.  Vocalist Roger Chapman, on his 27th birthday, throws a microphone stand into the audience, unintentionally in the direction of Fillmore East impresario Bill Graham.
April 20 – The L.A. Free Festival in Venice, California ends early following a riot of audience members, 117 of which are arrested.
April 22
The first complete performance of The Who's rock opera Tommy during a performance in Dolton, Devon, UK
A Garland for Dr. K., a celebratory collection in honour of the 80th birthday of Alfred Kalmus, consisting of eleven compositions by David Bedford, Harrison Birtwistle,  Richard Rodney Bennett, Luciano Berio,  Pierre Boulez, Cristóbal Halffter, Roman Haubenstock-Ramati,  Henri Pousseur, Bernard Rands, Karlheinz Stockhausen, and Hugh Wood is performed at the Queen Elizabeth Hall in the Southbank Centre, London, on a programme that also featured the word premieres of Eight Songs for a Mad King by Peter Maxwell Davies and Linoi II by Birtwistle.
John Lennon officially changes his name from John Winston Lennon to John Winston Ono-Lennon.
April 24 – The Beatles make a $5.1 million counter offer to the Northern Songs stockholders in an attempt to keep Associated TV from controlling the band's music.
April 28 – Chicago releases its debut album, The Chicago Transit Authority.
May – The Winstons release in the US the track "Amen Brother" as the B-side of R&B single "Color Him Father" from which drummer Gregory C. Coleman's 4-bar break, as the 'Amen break', becomes one of the most widely sampled tracks in history.
May 3
Sly & the Family Stone release their breakthrough album, Stand!, which became one of the top-selling albums of the decade and made the band one of the most popular acts in rock and soul music.
Jimi Hendrix is arrested by Canadian Mounties at Toronto's International Airport for possession of narcotics (heroin). Hendrix is released on $10,000 bail.
May 6 – In London, representatives of Warner Brothers-Seven Arts discuss the purchase of fifteen percent of The Beatles' Northern Songs.
May 10 – The Turtles perform at the White House. Singer Mark Volman falls off the stage five times.
May 16 – HPSCHD, an event conceived by John Cage and Lejaren Hiller as a highly immersive multimedia experience, received its premiere performance before an audience of 6000 at the Assembly Hall of the Urbana Campus, University of Illinois at Urbana–Champaign. 
May 23 – The Who release their rock opera Tommy.
 May 30–31 – First Annual Rock & Roll Revival in Detroit; Performers include among others MC5, Johnny Winter, Chuck Berry, Dr. John, Sun Ra, David Peel, The Stooges, Bonzo Dog Doo Dah Band 
June 2 – John Lennon and Yoko Ono host a "Bed-In" at the Queen Elizabeth Hotel in Montreal, Quebec, Canada. The couple records the song "Give Peace a Chance" live in their suite with Tommy Smothers, Timothy Leary, and several others.
June 7 – Blind Faith make their first live appearance with a free show In Hyde Park. Among the estimated 120,000 in attendance are Mick Jagger, Mick Fleetwood, Donovan, Chas Chandler, Noel Redding and Mitch Mitchell of the Jimi Hendrix Experience, Jim Capaldi and Chris Wood of Traffic, Terry Hicks of The Hollies, and Mike Hugg of Manfred Mann.
June 13 – Mick Taylor joins the Rolling Stones.
June 28 – The Stonewall riots erupt in New York City, marking the launch of the gay liberation movement.
June 29–August 24 – Harlem Cultural Festival in New York City.
June 29 – Bass player Noel Redding announces to the media that he has quit the Jimi Hendrix Experience, having effectively done so during the recording of Electric Ladyland.
July 1 – Cornelius Cardew's Scratch Orchestra holds its first meeting. Brian Eno begins his musical career as a member. 
July 3 – Brian Jones is found dead in the swimming pool at his home in Sussex, England, almost a month after leaving The Rolling Stones.
July 5 – The Rolling Stones proceed with a free concert in Hyde Park, London, as a tribute to Brian Jones; it is also the band's first concert with guitarist Mick Taylor. Estimates of the audience range from 250,000 to 400,000.
July 30 – Columbia records releases In A Silent Way by Miles Davis, one of the first jazz/rock fusion albums, featuring John McLaughlin, Joe Zawinul, and Chick Corea.
July 31 – Elvis Presley returns to live performances in Las Vegas. The engagement ends on August 28.
August 8 – Iain Macmillan photographs the cover picture for The Beatles' album Abbey Road at a north London zebra crossing near the Abbey Road Studios.
August 9 – Members of would-be folk singer Charles Manson's "family" murder film star Sharon Tate and others, in Tate's home.
August 15-17 – The Woodstock Music and Art Festival is held at Max Yasgur's dairy farm in Bethel, New York, near Woodstock, New York. Performers include Jimi Hendrix, Janis Joplin, The Who, The Band, Joan Baez, Crosby, Stills, Nash & Young, Jefferson Airplane, Santana, Country Joe and the Fish, Ten Years After, and Sly & the Family Stone.
August 20 – Final session for The Beatles' album Abbey Road at Abbey Road Studios in London, the last time all four members of the band are present in a studio together.
August 21-24 – The Jazz Bilzen Festival is held in Bilzen, Belgium. Performers include Deep Purple, Shocking Blue, The Moody Blues, Soft Machine, Bonzo Dog Doo Dah Band, The Move and Blossom Toes.
August 30-31 – The Isle of Wight Festival is held in Wootton Bridge. Performers include among others The Band, Blodwyn Pig, Edgar Broughton Band, Joe Cocker, Bonzo Dog Doo Dah Band, Bob Dylan (returning to live music after his motorbike accident in 1966), Family, The Who, Free, Mighty Baby, The Moody Blues, The Nice, The Pretty Things, Third Ear Band.
September 11 – Janis Joplin releases I Got Dem Ol' Kozmic Blues Again Mama! her first solo album since leaving the group Big Brother and the Holding Company.
September 13 – John Lennon and Plastic Ono Band perform at the Toronto Rock and Roll Revival 12-hour music festival, backed by Eric Clapton, Klaus Voormann and Alan White. Other performers on the bill include Chuck Berry, Bo Diddley, Little Richard, Jerry Lee Lewis and up-and-comers Chicago. It is Lennon's first-ever large-scale public rock performance (noting his lower-profile 1968 appearance in the Dirty Mac) without one or more of The Beatles since meeting Paul McCartney in 1957. He decides before returning to the UK to leave The Beatles permanently. During the show, a chicken is somehow in a feather pillow that Alice Cooper normally uses as a stage routine during his band's performance. Cooper, thinking that all birds fly, throws the chicken into the audience and fans tear the chicken and throw it back on stage. The event would be known as "The Chicken Incident" and Cooper develops his reputation as a shock-rocker.
September 24 – Deep Purple and the Royal Philharmonic Orchestra perform the Concerto for Group and Orchestra at the Royal Albert Hall in London, in the first elaborate collaboration between a rock band and an orchestra.
October 14 – The final single by Diana Ross & The Supremes, "Someday We'll Be Together", is released. The single, although credited to Diana Ross & the Supremes, was actually sung by Ross with session singers "the Andantes", instead of the other two Supremes. Nonetheless, it becomes the final number 1 hit of 1969 (and of the 1960s). After a farewell concert in January 1970, Diana Ross leaves the Supremes for a solo career.
October 18 – Bonzo Dog Doo Dah Band Live at the Fillmore East, NY.
October 22 – Led Zeppelin's second album is released with the song "Whole Lotta Love".
October 30 – Richard Nader first Rock and Roll Revival concert sells out, setting the stage for oldies as a commercial category.
November – Simon & Garfunkel give a live concert at Iowa State University, where they record the track "Bye, Bye Love" for their upcoming album Bridge Over Troubled Water.
November 1 – After seven years off the top of the charts, Elvis Presley hits No. 1 on the Billboard chart with "Suspicious Minds".
November 7 – The Rolling Stones open their US tour in Fort Collins, Colorado.
November 8 – Simon & Garfunkel, on tour for the first time with a band, give a live concert in Carbondale, Illinois, presumably at Southern Illinois University. The concert is not released until 1999 as part of a recording compiled by Head Records, called Village Vanguard.
November 11 – Simon & Garfunkel give a live concert at Miami University in Oxford, Ohio. The recording is later released in the 1990s as Back to College on Yellow Dog Records and A Time of Innocence on Bell Bottom Records.
November 15 
500,000 people march in Washington, D.C. for peace, which becomes the largest anti-war rally in U.S. history. Performing on stage: Arlo Guthrie, Pete Seeger, Peter, Paul and Mary, Richie Havens, Earl Scuggs, John Denver, Mitch Miller, touring cast of Hair
Musik für die Beethovenhalle in Bonn, a multi-auditorium retrospective concert of the music of Karlheinz Stockhausen, with the world premiere of his Fresco presented in four different foyer spaces continuously over a span of four-and-a-half hours.
November 29 – Billboard magazine changes its policy of charting the A and B sides of 45 singles on its pop chart. The former policy charted the two sides separately, but the new policy considers both sides as one chart entry.  The Beatles are the first beneficiary of the new policy as their current 45 single featuring "Come Together" on one side, and "Something" on the other, accrue enough combined points to make the single a #1 pop hit. Similarly, Creedence Clearwater Revival's "Fortunate Son" and "Down On The Corner" accrue enough combined points to reach number 3 three weeks later.
November 30 – Simon & Garfunkel air TV special Songs of America, ostensibly an hour-long show that is anti-war and anti-poverty featuring live footage from their 1969 tour.
December 6 
The Jackson 5 release their debut album, Diana Ross Presents The Jackson 5.
Altamont Free Concert
Zubin Mehta marries Nancy Kovack.
December 13 - the final episode of The Banana Splits Adventure Hour airs on NBC as the network cancels the program during a telecast of Rudolph the red nosed reindeer a week later.

Bands formed
See Musical groups established in 1969

Bands disbanded
 The Jeff Beck Group (reassembled with different line-up in 1971)
 Eric Burdon and the Animals (original Animals reform in 1975)
See also :Category:Musical groups disestablished in 1969

Albums released

January

February

March

April

May

June

July

August

September

October

November

December

Release date unknown

'69 – Mount Rushmore
'69 – The First Edition
2 Bugs and a Roach – Earl Hooker
10 to 23 – José Feliciano
25 Miles – Edwin Starr
Abraham, Martin & John – Moms Mabley
Adiós Nonino – Astor Piazzolla
After All – After All
Albert's House - Chet Baker
Alias Pink Puzz - Paul Revere & the Raiders
Alive - Nitty Gritty Dirt BandAlive Alive-O! – José FelicianoAlma-Ville - Vince GuaraldiAlways, Always - Porter Wagoner and Dolly PartonThe American Metaphysical Circus – Joseph ByrdAnthems in Eden – Shirley and Dolly Collins with the Early Music Consort of London directed by David MunrowAnother Voyage - Ramsey LewisAt Home with The Dubliners – The DublinersAt Home with Lynn - Lynn AndersonAtlantis - Sun RaBaby I Love You – Andy KimBack in Baby's Arms - Connie SmithThe Belle of Avenue A – The FugsThe Best of Cliff – Cliff RichardThe Best of Tommy James and The Shondells – Tommy James and the ShondellsThe Biggest Thing Since Colossus - Otis SpannBirthday – The PeddlersBlack Gipsy - Archie SheppA Black Man's Soul - Ike TurnerBlack Rhythm Happening - Eddie GaleThe Blue Potato and Other Outrages... - Ran BlakeBlues Obituary – The GroundhogsThe Blues and Other Colors - James MoodyBlues for We - Mel BrownThe Blues; That's Me! - Illinois JacquetThe Boss Is Back! - Gene AmmonsBoth Sides of People – People!Breathe Awhile – ArcadiumButch Cassidy and the Sundance Kid – Burt Bacharach – SoundtrackCaetano Veloso – Caetano VelosoCanta in Italiano – DalidaThe Charlatans – The Charlatans (debut)The Climax Chicago Blues Band – Climax Blues BandCold Blood – Cold BloodCountry Folk – Waylon JenningsDizzy – Tommy RoeDoctor Dunbar's Prescription – The Aynsley Dunbar RetaliationDoing His Thing – Ray CharlesDriftin' Way of Life – Jerry Jeff WalkerA Drop of The Dubliners – The DublinersEdwards Hand – Edwards HandElla – Ella FitzgeraldEngelbert – Engelbert HumperdinckEngelbert Humperdinck – Engelbert HumperdinckEveryday I Have the Blues – T-Bone WalkerThe Fabulous Charlie Rich – Charlie RichFirst Winter – Johnny WinterFeaturing: I Can't Quit Her – The Letter – The ArborsFor Children of All Ages – The Peanut Butter ConspiracyGalveston – The Lawrence Welk OrchestraA Gathering of Promises – Bubble PuppyGiant Step/De Ole Folks at Home - Taj MahalGilberto Gil – Gilberto GilGood Morning Starshine – OliverThe Good Rats – The Good Rats (debut)Grand Canyon Suite – Johnny CashThe Great American Eagle Tragedy – Earth OperaThe Greatest Little Soul Band in the Land – J.J. JacksonA Group Called Smith – SmithHand Me Down My Old Walking Stick – Big Joe WilliamsHank Marvin – Hank Marvin (debut solo)
Happy Heart – Andy Williams
The House of Blue Lights – Don Covay
The Howlin' Wolf Album – Howlin' Wolf
I Do Not Play No Rock 'n' Roll – Mississippi Fred McDowell
I'm All Yours-Baby! – Ray Charles
The Instrumental Sounds of Merle Haggard's Strangers – Merle Haggard & the Strangers
Introducing the Jaggerz – the Jaggerz
I Say a Little Prayer – Aretha Franklin - Compilation
Is This What You Want? – Jackie Lomax
It's The Dubliners – The Dubliners
It's Not Killing Me – Mike Bloomfield
Jackson – Johnny Cash
Jewels of Thought – Pharoah Sanders
Jimmy Cliff – Jimmy Cliff
Joe South's Greatest Hits Vol.1 – Joe South
Johnny Cash – Johnny Cash
John Hartford - John Hartford
Jorge Ben – Jorge Ben Jor
Live & Well – B.B. King
Live at the Albert Hall – The Dubliners 
Live at the Inferno (rec. 1967) – Raven 
Love Is All We Have to Give – Checkmates, Ltd.
Ma mère me disait – Dalida
A Man Alone – Frank Sinatra 
Moondog – Moondog
Music Is the Healing Force of the Universe – Albert Ayler
My Brother the Wind, Vol. 1 – Sun Ra
My Brother the Wind, Vol. 2 – Sun Ra
My Own Peculiar Way – Willie Nelson
A Natural Woman – Peggy Lee
O.C. Smith at Home – O. C. Smith
The Open Mind – The Open Mind
Ornette at 12 – Ornette Coleman
Orgasm – CromagnonOver and Over – Nana MouskouriPacific Gas and Electric – Pacific Gas & ElectricPeople in Sorrow – Art Ensemble of ChicagoPhallus Dei – Amon Düül IIPhotographs – Patrick Sky Rainbow Ride – Andy KimRaven – RavenRuby Don't Take Your Love To Town – Kenny Rogers and The First EditionSame Train, a Different Time – Marle Haggard & the StrangersSea Shanties – High TideSeattle – Perry ComoThe Second Brooklyn Bridge – The Brooklyn Bridge Selflessness: Featuring My Favorite Things – John ColtraneThe Simon Sisters Sing the Lobster Quadrille and Other Songs for Children – The Simon SistersSoul Shakedown – Bob Marley & The Wailers (debut)Spirit in the Sky – Norman Greenbaum Sunshine of Your Love – Ella FitzgeraldTake a Message to Mary – Don CherryTerry Reid – Terry ReidThe Belle of Avenue A – The FugsThesaurus – Clare FischerThis Is Desmond Dekkar – Desmond DekkerThunder On A Clear Day – Twentieth Century ZooTouching You, Touching Me – Neil Diamond Trogglomania – The TroggsThe Turning Point – John Mayall U.F.O. – Jim SullivanWalking in Space – Quincy JonesWanted Dead or Alive – Warren ZevonWaylon Jennings – Waylon JenningsWonder Where I'm Bound – Dion DiMucciYummy Yummy Yummy – Julie London

Biggest hit singles
The following songs achieved the highest chart positions
in the charts of 1969.

Some top hit singles

Published popular music
 1776: all songs by Sherman Edwards
 "Aa Jaane Jaan" w. Rajendra Krishan, m. Laxmikant–Pyarelal, from the film Intaqam "The April Fools" w. Hal David m. Burt Bacharach from the film The April Fools "Bad Moon Rising" w.m. John C. Fogerty
 "The Brady Bunch theme", by Frank DeVol
 "Bridge over Troubled Water" w.m. Paul Simon
 "Didn't We?" w.m. Jimmy Webb
 "Down on the Corner" w.m. John C. Fogerty
 "Everybody's Talkin'" w.m. Fred Neil
 "Hawaii Five-O" m. Mort Stevens
 If You Could Read My Mind"     w.m. Gordon Lightfoot
 "In The Ghetto"     w.m.Mac Davis
 "Is That All There Is?"     w.m. Jerry Leiber & Mike Stoller
 "Israelites"     w.m. Desmond Dekker & Leslie Kong
 "Keem-O-Sabe" m. Bernard Binnick & Bernice Borisoff
 "Jean" w.m. Rod McKuen from the film The Prime of Miss Jean Brodie "Just Leave Everything to Me" w.m. Jerry Herman, from the film version of Hello, Dolly! "Leaving on a Jet Plane" w.m. John Denver
 "Le métèque" w.m. Georges Moustaki
 "Marrakesh Express" w.m. Graham Nash
 "Mere Sapno Ki Rani" w. Anand Bakshi, m. Sachin Dev Burman, from the film Aradhana "Mná na hÉireann" w. Peadar Ó Doirnín, m. Seán Ó Riada
 "Odds and Ends (Of a Beautiful Love Affair)" w. Hal David m. Burt Bacharach
 "Piddle, Twiddle And Resolve"     w.m. Sherman Edwards
 "Proud Mary" w.m. John C. Fogerty
 "Put a Little Love in Your Heart" w.m. Jimmy Holiday, Randy Myers & Jackie DeShannon
 "Raindrops Keep Fallin' On My Head"     w.Hal David m. Burt Bacharach.  Introduced by B. J. Thomas on the soundtrack of the film Butch Cassidy and the Sundance Kid. The song won the Academy Award.
 "Suspicious Minds" w.m. Fred Zambon
 "Sweet Caroline" w.m. Neil Diamond
 "Teddybjörnen Fredriksson" w.m. Lasse Berghagen
 "What Are You Doing the Rest of Your Life?" w. Alan and Marilyn Bergman m. Michel Legrand
 "Yellow River" w.m. Christie
 "You Don't Love Me When I Cry" w.m. Laura Nyro

Classical music
Rob du BoisBecause Going Nowhere Takes a Long Time, version for soprano, clarinet, and piano Enigma, for flute, bass clarinet, percussion, and pianoJeu, for oboePastorale I, for oboe, clarinet, and harp (revised version)Réflexions sur le jour où Pérotin le Grand ressuscitera, for wind quintetSouvenir, for violinSymposion, for oboe, violin, viola, and celloTrio agitato, for horn, trombone, and tuba
Benjamin Britten 
 Suite for harp, Op. 83
 Who Are These Children?, song cycle for tenor and piano, Op. 84
Gavin Bryars – The Sinking of the TitanicSylvano Bussotti – Rara RequiemGian Paolo Chiti – Violin Concerto
George CrumbNight of the Four Moons for alto, alto flute/piccolo, banjo, electric cello, and percussionMadrigals, Books III (for soprano, harp, and percussion) and Books IV for soprano, flute/alto flute/piccolo, harp, double bass, and percussion
Mario Davidovsky – Synchronisms No. 5 for percussion players and tape
Peter Maxwell Davies – St Thomas WakeVagn Holmboe – String Quartet no. 10, Op. 102
György Ligeti – Ramifications for 12 solo strings (1968–69)
Francis Jackson – Sonata for Organ No. 1
Miklós Rózsa – Concerto for Cello
Dmitri Shostakovich – Symphony No. 14, Op. 135, for soprano, bass, string orchestra and percussion
Karlheinz StockhausenDr K–Sextett, for flute, bass clarinet, viola, cello, percussion (tubular chimes and vibraphone), and pianoFresco. for four orchestral groupsHymnen, Third Region, electronic music with orchestraMomente (third and final version)Stop (Paris version, for 19 players)
Leif Thybo – Concerto for Violin and Orchestra
Eduard Tubin – Symphony No. 9, "Sinfonia semplice"
Iannis XenakisSynaphaï, for piano and orchestraPersephassa, for 6 percussionistsAnaktoria, for clarinet, bassoon, horn, string quartet and double bass
Hans Zender – Canto II, for soprano, chorus and orchestra (after Ezra Pound's Canto XXXIX)

Opera
Gordon Crosse – The Grace of ToddJakov Gotovac – Petar SvačićTom Phillips – Irma (composed; premiere in 1970)
Henri Pousseur – Votre Faust (Milan: Piccola Scala, 15 January)

Jazz

Musical theater
 1776     Broadway production opened at the 46th Street Theatre on March 16, transferred to the St. James Theatre on December 28, 1970, and transferred to the Majestic Theatre on April 27, 1971, for a total run of 1217 performances
 Ann Veronica ( Music: Cyril Ornadel, Lyrics: David Croft) London production opened at the Cambridge Theatre on April 17 and ran for 44 performances
 Canterbury Tales     Broadway production ran for 121 performances
 Coco (Music: André Previn, Lyrics: Alan Jay Lerner, Book: Alan Jay Lerner)      Broadway production opened at the Mark Hellinger Theatre on December 18 and ran for 329 performances
 Dear World     Broadway production opened at the Mark Hellinger Theatre on February 6 and ran for 132 performances
 La Strada (Music and Lyrics: Lionel Bart)     Broadway production opened at the Lunt-Fontanne Theatre on December 14 and ran for one performance
 Mame     London production opened at the Theatre Royal on February 20 and ran for 443 performances
 Promises, Promises     London production opened at the Prince of Wales Theatre on October 2 and ran for 560 performances

Musical films

 Aradhana, Hindi film
 Can Heironymus Merkin Ever Forget Mercy Humppe and Find True Happiness?, British film
 El Profesor Hippie, Argentine musical comedy
 Goodbye, Mr. Chips, starring Peter O'Toole and Petula Clark
 Hello, Dolly!, starring Barbra Streisand and Walter Matthau
 Oh! What a Lovely War, starring Maggie Smith and Dirk Bogarde
 Paint Your Wagon, starring Lee Marvin and Clint Eastwood
 Przygoda z piosenką (Adventure with Song) Polish musical comedy
 Sweet Charity, starring Shirley MacLaine
 Bremenskiye musykanty (Town Musicians of Bremen), Soviet musical cartoon

Publications
 Nik Cohn – Pop – From The Beginning (later editions as Awopbopaloobop Alopbamboom)

Births
January 3 – Bayani Agbayani, Filipino TV personality
January 4 – Boris Berezovsky, pianist
January 5 – Marilyn Manson, industrial rock metal singer-songwriter and visual artist
January 14 – Dave Grohl, American singer-songwriter, musician, record producer, film director and activist (Nirvana, Foo Fighters and Slipknot)
January 25 – Kina, American singer-songwriter 
January 27 – Cornelius, Japanese shibuya-kei musician
February 1 
Joshua Redman, American saxophonist and composer (The Bad Plus)
Patrick Wilson, American drummer (Weezer, The Special Goodness and The Rentals)
February 2 – Dana International, Israeli Eurovision-winning pop singer
February 5 – Bobby Brown, American R&B singer (New Edition)
February 13 – Joyce DiDonato, American operatic lyric-coloratura mezzo-soprano
February 19 – Burton C. Bell, American musician and vocalist (Fear Factory)
February 21 – James Dean Bradfield, Welsh rock singer-songwriter (Manic Street Preachers)
March 1 – Dafydd Ieuan, Welsh rock drummer (Super Furry Animals)
March 11 – Pete Droge, American folk rock musician
March 13 – Susanna Mälkki, Finnish cellist and orchestra conductor.
March 18 – Andy Cutting, English folk accordionist
March 25 – Cathy Dennis, British singer-songwriter, composer, record producer, musician and actress
March 27 – Mariah Carey, American singer-songwriter
April 8 – Dulce Pontes, Portuguese singer-songwriter
April 10 – Yoo Young-jin, South Korean singer-songwriter and record producer
April 11 – Cerys Matthews, Welsh singer-songwriter, author and broadcaster
April 27
Darcey Bussell, ballerina
Mica Paris, singer
April 29 – Master P, rapper, record label owner
May 7 – Mox Cristadoro, Italian drummer (Monumentum)
May 13 – Buckethead (born Brian Caroll), guitarist.
May 14 – Danny Wood (New Kids on the Block)
May 15 – Assala Nasri, musical artist
May 18 – Martika, American singer-songwriter and actress,
May 24 – Rich Robinson (The Black Crowes)
May 29 – Chandler Kinchla (Blues Traveler)
May 31 – Sarah-Jane McGrath, singer-songwriter
June 5 – Brian McKnight, singer-songwriter
June 7 – Armando Tranquilino, composer
June 13 – Søren Rasted, Aqua
June 15 – Ice Cube, rapper
June 16 – Bénabar, singer-songwriter
June 25 
Hunter Foster, American actor and singer
Zim Zum, American guitarist and songwriter (The Pop Culture Suicides)
June 28 – Danielle Brisebois, American producer, singer-songwriter and former child actress. 
July 2 – Jenni Rivera, American singer-songwriter, producer and actress (d. 2012)
July 5 – RZA, American  rapper, record producer and author
July 7
Nathalie Simard, Canadian singer  (René Simard)
Cree Summer, American-Canadian singer-songwriter and actress (Subject to Change)
July 8
George Fisher, American singer-songwriter (Cannibal Corpse, Monstrosity and Paths of Possession)
Sugizo, Japanese singer-songwriter, guitarist, producer and actor (Luna Sea, X Japan, Juno Reactor and S.K.I.N.)
July 10 – Jonas Kaufmann, operatic tenor
July 24 – Jennifer Lopez,  American singer, actress, songwriter, performer, dancer, author, philanthropist and producer
August 6 – Elliott Smith, indie singer-songwriter (d. 2003)
August 12 – Tanita Tikaram, British pop/folk singer-songwriter
August 17 
Uhm Jung-hwa, South Korean actress and singer
Kelvin Mercer, American rapper and producer (De La Soul)
Donnie Wahlberg (New Kids on the Block)
August 18 
Everlast, singer
Masta Killa, American rapper (La Coka Nostra)
August 19 – Clay Walker, country singer
August 29 – Meshell Ndegeocello, funk singer-songwriter and rapper
September 5 – Dweezil Zappa, guitarist and son of Frank Zappa
September 6 – CeCe Peniston, singer
September 16
Marc Anthony, singer-songwriter
Janno Gibbs, Filipino singer-songwriter
September 17
Lynette Diaz, American born singer-songwriter and radio host
Keith Flint, English electronic music singer and dancer (The Prodigy) (d. 2019)
September 19 – Jóhann Jóhannsson, Icelandic composer (d. 2018)
September 24
Shawn Crahan, percussionist/backing vocalist for Slipknot
DeVante Swing, singer-songwriter, record producer
October 3 – Gwen Stefani, American singer-songwriter, fashion designer and actress (No Doubt)
October 7
Per Mathisen, Norwegian bass player and composer
Maria Whittaker, English model, actress and singer
October 9 – PJ Harvey, English musician, singer-songwriter, writer, poet and composer
October 16 
Roy Hargrove, American trumpeter and composer (d. 2018)
Wendy Wilson, American singer and television personality Wilson Phillips
October 17 – Wyclef Jean, Haitian rapper, musician and actor(Fugees)
October 22 – Helmut Lotti, Belgian singer
October 30 – Snow, reggae musician
November 3 – Robert Miles, DJ
November 4 – Sean Combs (P. Diddy), rapper
November 9 – Scarface, rapper
November 13 – Josh Mancell, American drummer and composer (The Moon Upstairs)
December 4
Scott St. John, viola player
Jay-Z, rapper
December 9 – Jakob Dylan, American rock singer-songwriter (The Wallflowers), son of Bob Dylan and Sara Lownds
December 17 – Michael V., Filipino Television Personality
December 19 – Aziza Mustafa Zadeh, Azerbaijani jazz musician and singer
December 21 – Julie Delpy,  French-American actress, film director, screenwriter and singer-songwriter
December 24 – Mariko Shiga, Japanese singer (d. 1989)
December 30 – Matt Goldman, American record producer

Deaths
January 4 – Paul Chambers, jazz bassist (b. 1935) (tuberculosis)
January 17 – Grażyna Bacewicz,  Polish composer and violinist (b. 1909)
February 15 – Pee Wee Russell, jazz clarinetist (b. 1906)
February 20 – Ernest Ansermet, conductor (b. 1883)
February 23 – Constantin Silvestri, conductor and composer (b. 1913)
March 25 – Billy Cotton, bandleader (b. 1899)
March 26 – Clara Dow, operatic soprano (b. 1883)
April 2 – Fortunio Bonanova, baritone (b. 1895)
April 4 – Fanny Anitùa, operatic contralto (b. 1887)
April 10 – Fernando Ortiz, ethnomusicologist (b. 1881)
April 20 – Benny Benjamin ("Papa Zita"), drummer (b. 1925) (stroke)
April 22 – Amparo Iturbi, Spanish pianist (b. 1898)
April 23 – Krzysztof Komeda, jazz musician and composer (b. 1931) (haematoma)
April 29 – Julius Katchen, pianist (b. 1926) (cancer)
May 1 – Ella Logan, actress and singer (b. 1913)
May 17 – Maria Olszewska, operatic contralto (b. 1892)
May 22 – Nicola Salerno, Italian lyricist (b. 1910)
May 9 – Elias Breeskin, violinist, conductor and composer (b. 1896)
May 23 – Jimmy McHugh, US composer and pianist (b. 1894)
June 14
Roberto Firpo, Argentine tango pianist (b. 1884)
Wynonie Harris, R & B singer ("Mister Blues") (b. 1915)
June 17 – Rita Abatzi, rebetiko musician (b. 1914)
June 22 – Judy Garland, singer and actress (b. 1922) (overdose of barbiturates)
July 3 – Brian Jones, guitarist, founder member of The Rolling Stones (b. 1942) (drowned)
July 5 – Wilhelm Backhaus, pianist (b. 1884)
July 10 – Thomas King Ekundayo Phillips, church music composer (b. 1884)
July 11 – Hina Spani, operatic soprano (b. 1896)
July 20 – Roy Hamilton, American singer (b. 1929; stroke)
July 26 – Frank Loesser, US songwriter (b. 1910)
August 6 – Theodor Adorno, exponent of the "New Music" (b. 1903)
August 11 – Miriam Licette, operatic soprano (b. 1885)
August 13 – Jacob do Bandolim, mandolin player and composer (b. 1918)
September 5 – Josh White, blues musician (b. 1914)
September 14 – Alice Zeppilli, operatic soprano (b. 1885)
October 3 – Skip James, blues musician (b. 1902)
October 4 – Natalino Otto, Italian singer (b. 1912)
October 22 – Tommy Edwards, singer (b. 1922)
November 8 – Ricardo Aguirre, protest singer (b. 1939)
November 13 – Boris Kroyt, classical violinist and violist, member of the Budapest String Quartet from 1936 to 1967 (b. 1897)
November 18 – Ted Heath, bandleader (b. 1902)
November 23 – Spade Cooley, swing musician and murderer (b. 1910) (heart attack)
December 1 – Magic Sam, blues musician (b. 1937) (heart attack)
December 5 – James "Stump" Johnson, blues pianist (b. 1902)
December 6 – Walther Aeschbacher, Swiss conductor and composer (b. 1901)
December 22 – Wilbur Hatch, pianist, composer and conductor (b. 1902)
December 24 – Mary Barratt Due, pianist, music teacher (b. 1888)date unknown – Marcel LaFosse, trumpeter (b. 1895)probable'' – Mississippi Joe Callicott, blues musician (b. 1900)

Awards

Grammy Awards
Grammy Awards of 1969

Eurovision Song Contest
Eurovision Song Contest 1969

Leeds International Piano Competition
Radu Lupu

References

External links
 
 

 
20th century in music
Music by year